Jade Melbourne (born 18 August 2002) is an Australian professional basketball player for the Seattle Storm of the Women's National Basketball Association (WNBA). She plays for the Australian national team.

She represented Australia at the 2021 FIBA Women's Asia Cup, where the team won the bronze medal.

References

External links

2002 births
Living people
Australian women's basketball players
Basketball players from Melbourne
Guards (basketball)
Seattle Storm draft picks